H33 is a Ukrainian national highway (H-highway), passing through the territory of the Odesa region. The route was previously designated as territorial road T-16-04 until 2013 and regional road P-70 from 2013 to 2017, when it was redesignated as national highway H33.

Whole length 

Main route 

Route map: :

Notes

References
 
 
 
 

Roads in Ukraine
Roads in Odesa Oblast